Stjärnsund is a village in Hedemora Municipality, Dalarna County, Sweden, with 161 inhabitants in 2010.

Etymology 
The name is derived from the Swedish words "stjärna" (star) and "sund" (strait).

References 

Populated places in Dalarna County
Populated places in Hedemora Municipality